Parliamentary elections were held in Latvia on 2 October 2010. It was the first parliamentary election to be held in Latvia since the beginning of the economic crisis during which Latvia had experienced one of the deepest recessions in the world.

A total of 1,239 candidates representing 13 parties or alliances stood in five electoral constituencies equivalent to the four regions of Latvia and Riga city. With 1012 of 1013 polling stations counted, results showed an increase in support for the incumbent coalition government of Valdis Dombrovskis, with 58% of the vote and 63 of the 100 seats.

Background
It appeared that early elections would be held in early 2009, when the government was faced with violent protests over the effects of the global financial crisis of 2008–2009 on Latvia and some politicians saw early elections as the only way to confront the people's anger. The elections were to be averted if the Saeima passed constitutional reform laws, including a law to allow referendums on dissolving parliament, by  2009; if this had not happened, the President of Latvia, Valdis Zatlers, would have dissolved parliament.

After surviving a vote of no confidence in early February, PM Ivars Godmanis resigned on  2009 after the two largest parties (People's Party and the Union of Greens and Farmers) called for his dismissal. A new government was formed, headed by Valdis Dombrovskis. There were also discussions that President Zatlers might use the parliamentary dissolution power of Latvian President to call a referendum on holding early elections.

The tasks given to parliament were: pass constitutional amendments to allow the people to dissolve parliament, passing electoral reforms and setting up an economic supervisory council for the recovery plan and international loans. The tasks given to the government were: coming up with a recovery plan and implementing it, appointing a new head for the Corruption Prevention Board, and reorganising the government and public administration. Zatlers stated he would hold talks with politicians from all parties on  2009 and announce his assessment of the situation on the same day.

On 31 March 2009, Zatlers announced he would not dissolve parliament. The Saeima was to consider constitutional amendments as early as  2009.

Changes to the electoral law
Several changes to the election law took effect for this election. The so-called "locomotive law" meant that candidates were restricted to standing in one constituency. In addition to completing registration forms in paper format, for the first time, parties also had to register electronically. Finally laws relating to election spending were tightened, in particular, laws against third party advertising on behalf of political parties were strengthened.

Contesting parties
There are thirteen parties and electoral alliances running:
 FHRUL (For Human Rights in United Latvia) (PCTVL - Par cilvēka tiesībām vienotā Latvijā)
 Unity (Vienotība): comprising the New Era Party, Civic Union and Society for Other Politics
 Made in Latvia (Ražots Latvijā)
 Association of political parties 'Harmony Centre' (Politisko partiju apvienība 'Saskaņas Centrs'): formed by the Social Democratic Party "Harmony", Socialist Party of Latvia and the Daugavpils City Party
 People's Control (Tautas kontrole)
 Union of Greens and Farmers (Zaļo un Zemnieku savienība): consisting of the Latvian Farmers' Union and the Green Party of Latvia
 For Presidential Republic (Par prezidentālu republiku)
 For a Good Latvia (Par labu Latviju): of the People's Party, Latvia's First Party/Latvian Way and For a Good Latvia
 RESPONSIBILITY – Social Democratic Association of Political Parties (ATBILDĪBA – sociāldemokrātiska politisko partiju apvienība)
 Party 'Daugava - For Latvia' (Partija 'Daugava - Latvijai')
 The Last Party (Pēdējā partija)
 National Association 'All For Latvia!' – 'For Fatherland and Freedom/LNNK' (Nacionālā apvienība 'Visu Latvijai' – 'Tēvzemei un Brīvībai/LNNK'): consisting of For Fatherland and Freedom/LNNK and All For Latvia!
 Christian Democratic Union (Kristīgi demokrātiskā savienība)

New electoral alliances established
In the run-up to the election, three right-wing parties (New Era Party, Civic Union and Society for Other Politics) established an alliance called Unity on  2010. Furthermore, most of the parties constituting the Harmony Centre alliance (National Harmony Party, New Centre and Social Democratic Party – but not the Socialist Party of Latvia and the Daugavpils City Party) had merged into the Social Democratic Party "Harmony" on  2010. On  2010, the People's Party and the Latvia's First Party/Latvian Way formed an electoral alliance (including the newly founded businessmen's movement For a Good Latvia) called For a Good Latvia.

Unity on 28 May 2010 declined to include For Fatherland and Freedom/LNNK and the far-right All For Latvia! in their alliance; these two parties then decided to form an electoral alliance.

Pre-election debates
Numerous televised debates took place prior to the election. These involved either the party leaders or other senior party figures. In all, seven debates took place on the LNT Channel, five of these were held on a regional basis and all involved parties which were polling 2% or above in opinion polls. A total of eleven debates took place on the LTV Channel, five of which were held on a regional basis, with one debate between the Prime Ministerial candidates and a further five held on the basis of five themes: Finance, Prosperity, Health, Economy and Development, and Education and Culture. Like the LNT debates, these involved parties which opinion polls indicated would poll 2% or more. A twelfth debate was held on LTV between the remaining seven parties or electoral lists which were not expected to poll 2%. The two debates held on the PBK Channel involved the four parties which the opinion polls indicated would poll 5% or more. However outgoing Prime Minister Valdis Dombrovskis refused to take part in the debate, following controversy over previous remarks made by the debate's moderator Aleksandr Gordon. Unity decided not to send a replacement and were absent from the debate.

Opinion polls
Pre-election polls had indicated that the outgoing government could be re-elected however they had also pointed to the possibility of one of the main opposition parties, Harmony Centre, making gains and becoming the largest party in the Saeima.

According to a poll conducted in June by Latvijas fakti, Harmony Centre would get 18.5% of the vote; Unity, 16.2%; Union of Greens and Farmers, 11.3%; For a Good Latvia, 5.3% and National Alliance, 4.4%.

A later Latvijas Fakti poll conducted between 25 and  2010 showed 21.2% support for Harmony Centre, 19.2% for Unity, 9.9% for Greens and Farmers and For Fatherland and Freedom on 5.2%. For a Good Latvia, led by members of the previous government, was at 7.8%. About 19 percent of the 1,004 respondents were undecided. The margin of error was 3.2 percent.

Conduct
OSCE/ODIHR Limited Election Observation Mission provided, among others, the following recommendations:
allowing independent candidates to stand in elections;
giving consideration to granting “non-citizens” of Latvia the right to vote in municipal elections;
issuing voter education materials in minority languages, enabling use of minority languages when dealing with election authorities;
stronger sanctions for campaign violations;
reviewing candidacy restrictions based on lustration provisions with a view to bringing them to an early end.

Results

Aftermath
Though the result made a variety of coalition options possible, including a coalition government formed by Harmony Centre and The Union of Greens and Farmers, Dombrovskis said that Unity and the Greens and Farmers had agreed to continue working together and form a government, to be approved by parliament on 2 November. For Fatherland and Freedom was also expected to be part of the government. However Dombrovskis also said that he was seeking a cooperation deal with Harmony Centre in a bid to win additional support for further budget cuts. "We offer an opportunity to sign a cooperation agreement with Harmony Center, to agree on cooperation in parliament, maybe, also delegating a minister."

References

Latvia
Parliamentary elections in Latvia
2010 in Latvia